Cindy is a 1978 American musical television film that features an entirely African-American cast. Directed by William A. Graham, the film is an urbanized retelling of Cinderella.

Plot
After World War II, Cindy (Woodard) has moved from the south to live in Harlem with her newly blended family. She finds herself constantly abused by her stepmother and stepsisters. Her father (Mitchell) provides some comfort but cannot prevent the abuse entirely.  One night, she meets Captain Joe Prince (Davis) and is swept off her feet. Soon after, a romance ensues.

Cast
Charlayne Woodard as Cindy
Cleavant Derricks as Michael Simpson
Mae Mercer as Sara Hayes
Nell Carter as Olive
Alaina Reed Hall as Venus
Scoey Mitchell as Cindy's Father
Clifton Davis as Captain Joe Prince
W. Benson Terry as Miles Archer

Musical numbers
All songs are composed by Stan Daniels, unless otherwise noted.
"Jesus, Lover of My Soul" (Charles Wesley) - Cindy and Cast
"Sugar Hill Ball" - Olive, Venus and Cindy
"Your Feet's Too Big" (Fred Fisher, Ada Benson) - Fats Waller
"Men's Room Attendant" - Cindy's Father and Male Chorus
"When It Happens" - Joe, Cindy, Olive, Venus, and Sara
"Love Is the Magic" - Cindy

Awards and nominations

See also
 Rodgers & Hammerstein's Cinderella (1997), ABC's remake of the 1957 musical version of the fairy tale starring Brandy and Whitney Houston as Cinderella and her fairy godmother respectively
 The Wiz (1978), a version of The Wizard of Oz with an all-Black cast

External links
 
 
 

Films based on Charles Perrault's Cinderella
Films based on Cinderella
1978 television films
1978 films
ABC network original films
Films directed by William Graham (director)